Roger Graham Twose  (born 17 April 1968) is an English-born former cricketer, who played 16 Test matches and 87 One Day Internationals for New Zealand in the mid-1990s. In February 2021, Twose was appointed as the director of New Zealand Cricket.

Early life
Twose was born at Torquay in England, educated at King's College, Taunton, and after playing for Warwickshire County Cricket Club, Twose moved to play in New Zealand in 1991–92. Twose performed well in New Zealand for several seasons, eventually being selected for a national cap on New Zealand's 1995 tour to India.

International career
In the 1998/1999 season, Twose returned to the New Zealand side and soon became recognised as one of the best one day batsmen in the world, known as "the switch-hitter". Twose followed strong performances against India and South Africa by being New Zealand's most successful batsman at the 1999 Cricket World Cup, scoring 318 runs at an average of 79.50. Further he achieved all this whilst studying a university course by correspondence.

Following his retirement from Test cricket, Twose continued to perform consistently in the One Day International arena, rising to 2nd in the world batting rankings. He reached his peak on New Zealand's 2000 tour of South Africa when he finally scored his first and only century after 75 matches. His performances resulted in one of New Zealand cricket's cult mantras "We need sixes, fours and Twose to win". His blistering innings of 87 against Pakistan in the 2000 ICC KnockOut Trophy semi final allowed New Zealand to defeat a strong looking Pakistan, and he also contributed to their win against India in the Final. New Zealand seized that year's Champion's Trophy to win their first major ICC Tournament.

References

External links
 
 Our People

1968 births
Living people
People educated at King's College, Taunton
Central Districts cricketers
New Zealand One Day International cricketers
New Zealand Test cricketers
New Zealand cricketers
Northern Districts cricketers
Warwickshire cricketers
Wellington cricketers
Devon cricketers
English emigrants to New Zealand
North Island cricketers
Sportspeople from Torquay